Lambert Airport Terminal 1 is a St. Louis MetroLink station. It is one of three stations to have an escalator system, with the other two being 8th & Pine and Convention Center. The station is attached to the eastern end of Terminal 1 at St. Louis-Lambert International Airport and also serves some nearby hotels.

Terminal 1 serves Air Canada, Alaska Airlines, American Airlines, Cape Air, Delta, Frontier Airlines, Spirit, and United Airlines.

In 2014, Metro's Arts in Transit program commissioned the work Nucleic Life Formation by Amy Cheng for installation in the station. Nucleic Life Formation consists of two abstract mural designs, one over the station's escalators, the other adjacent to the platform entrance. Both designs are suggestive of striated nightscapes crossed by a constellation of “stars” that loosely mimics a DNA double helix.

Station layout
The station is accessed via a corridor on the ticketing level of Terminal 1, near Entry 2. An escalator or an elevator then takes passengers up to the platform level from the ticketing level.

References

External links
 St. Louis Metro

MetroLink stations in St. Louis County, Missouri
Red Line (St. Louis MetroLink)
Airport railway stations in the United States
Railway stations in the United States opened in 1994
1994 establishments in Missouri
Terminal 1 station